Yusleidy Figueroa (born 9 January 1993) is a Venezuelan weightlifter. She competed in the women's 58 kg event at the 2016 Summer Olympics. She also represented Venezuela at the 2020 Summer Olympics in Tokyo, Japan. She finished in 6th place in the women's 59 kg event.

References

External links
 

1993 births
Living people
Venezuelan female weightlifters
Olympic weightlifters of Venezuela
Weightlifters at the 2016 Summer Olympics
Weightlifters at the 2020 Summer Olympics
Place of birth missing (living people)
Pan American Games medalists in weightlifting
Pan American Games silver medalists for Venezuela
Weightlifters at the 2015 Pan American Games
South American Games silver medalists for Venezuela
South American Games bronze medalists for Venezuela
South American Games medalists in weightlifting
Competitors at the 2018 South American Games
Medalists at the 2015 Pan American Games
Pan American Weightlifting Championships medalists
21st-century Venezuelan women